Robert Earl "Bob" Petrich (born March 15, 1941) is a former professional American football defensive end in the American Football League. 

Petrich played college football for West Texas State University, and then played four seasons for the San Diego Chargers (1963–1966) and the Buffalo Bills (1967).  He also played one season for the Toronto Argonauts to end his professional career.

References

1941 births
Living people
Sportspeople from Long Beach, California
Players of American football from Long Beach, California
Players of Canadian football from Long Beach, California
American football defensive ends
West Texas A&M Buffaloes football players
San Diego Chargers players
Buffalo Bills players
American Football League players